Isophrictis similiella is a moth of the family Gelechiidae. It was described by Vactor Tousey Chambers in 1872. It is found in North America, where it has been recorded from Kentucky, Arkansas, Illinois, Indiana, Maine, Manitoba, Massachusetts, Oklahoma, Pennsylvania, Saskatchewan and Texas.

The wingspan is about 11 mm.

The larvae bore in the receptacle of Solanum carolinense and the flowerheads of Rudbeckia hirta. They burrow down the stem up to three inches to pupate, chewing an exit hole before pupating.

References

Moths described in 1872
Isophrictis